Kinetochore protein Nuf2 is a protein that in humans is encoded by the NUF2 gene.

This gene encodes a protein that is highly similar to yeast Nuf2, a component of a conserved protein complex associated with the centromere. Yeast Nuf2 disappears from the centromere during meiotic prophase when centromeres lose their connection to the spindle pole body, and plays a regulatory role in chromosome segregation.

The encoded protein is found to be associated with centromeres of mitotic HeLa cells, which suggests that this protein is a functional homolog of yeast Nuf2. Alternatively spliced transcript variants that encode the same protein have been described.

References

Further reading